Mr. Freeman is a Russian animated web series named after its main character. The series appeared on YouTube on September 21, 2009 and got considerable popularity in Runet. The main content of the series is monologues which in a harsh manner criticize the lifestyle of modern everyman. As of July, 2019 there are 24 episodes published, with a total of 42 uploads to the channel. The total number of views is more than 76 million.

The earliest five episodes were dubbed by the Russian actor Vadim Demchog. On November 14, 2010 Demchog officially announced his immediate relation to the project. After that, the production of new episodes temporarily ceased, but on January 11, 2011 a new video was released. Since the episode "Me?" Vadim Demchog dubs the series again.

It is also known that an animator Pavel Muntyan worked on the first series.

A possible prototype of the series is believed to be the main character of "Franky-show", broadcast from 2003 to 2011 on the Silver Rain Radio, which is also dubbed by exactly Vadim Demchog, and the script writer of some episodes is Pavel Muntyan. Many episodes of the program have been transferred to the cartoon, for example, the text of the ending of the episode "Franky-show. Cicciolina" is almost completely identical to the third episode of Mr. Freeman's "Part 03. Will Sell Myself Expensive".

In June 2018 Mr. Freeman announced the foundation of Virtual State of Freeland.

General synopsis and subject 
The animated series contains many symbols and hints. For example, Freeman may appear as a shape containing the stereotypical traits of some specific individuals or social groups (for example, while saying "I've placed everything under my will", Freeman is standing on a pedestal in a cap-cornered hat, holding his hand at the chest level). There are also hidden frames in the series, which contain elements of a larger image. In addition, there are details, insignificant at first glance, such as numbers 21.12.12 into which the ECG transforms in the first episode, which are the estimated date of completion of the current era according to the Maya calendar. These and many other details nourish many versions about the identity of Freeman and his goals.

Dubbing 
At the beginning of 2023, the project launched official language versions of the series: in English, Ukrainian, Spanish, Italian, Albanian languages. English dubs were voiced by American actor Scott Greer, adopted by Michael Mennies and Jeffrey Hylton. At the moment, work is underway to launch channels in the following languages: Polish, Brazilian Portuguese, Latin American Spanish, Korean, Georgian, German and French.

List of episodes

Video questions

Other appearances

Awards 
 On April 15, 2010 in Berlin at the international Weblog competition The Best of Blogs the blog "Mr. Freeman" was voted Best Videoblog.

Facts 
 All episodes except for Part 0 have two identical frames containing a hidden piece of some puzzle.
 On March 31, 2011 at 18:30 on the official site a video "Walking on by" appeared, in which Mr. Freeman rips the heart out of Mirax Plaza and takes it himself. At the same time the company Mirax turned off a 10-meter heart, which had been beating in that building for two years as an advertising campaign of Mirax "The heart of the city."

Speeches 
 May 31, 2010 in Moscow took premiere of part 49 at 3, Bolotnaya naberezhnaya, with the support of «Cyberbrothers».
 On June 15, 2010 Mr. Freeman appeared on the television. Episodes are broadcast on channel 2x2 every Monday and Friday at midnight.
 On June 23, 2010 at the 17th transpersonal congress a welcoming performance was organized for members of the congress by Mr.Freeman.

See also 
 Pattern Recognition by William Gibson

References

External links 
  
 Official channel at YouTube
 Official LJ-page
 Official blog at Twitter 
 Fun's page

2009 web series debuts
2010s animated television series
Russian adult animated television series
Animated web series
Russian adult animated comedy television series